Edgardo di Meola (23 September 1950 – 16 November 2005) was an Argentine footballer who played as a forward.

References

1950 births
2005 deaths
Association football forwards
Argentine footballers
Pan American Games medalists in football
Pan American Games gold medalists for Argentina
Footballers at the 1971 Pan American Games
Club Atlético Colón footballers
Medalists at the 1971 Pan American Games